The 2006 Poinsettia Bowl was an American college football bowl game between the Texas Christian University Horned Frogs (TCU) and the Northern Illinois Huskies (NIU) on December 19, 2006 at Qualcomm Stadium in San Diego, California. TCU defeated NIU 37–7 in this game, which was the second year in the bowl's existence.

Scoring summary
TCU - Hobbs 4 yard touchdown run (Manfedini kick blocked), 1st 12:03 (3-26, 0:46)
TCU - Ballard 10 yard touchdown run (Manfredini kick), 2nd 14:49 (7-55, 2:09)
TCU - Manfredini 25 yard field goal, 2nd 0:00 (12-77, 3:52)
TCU - Ballard 1 yard touchdown run (Manfredini kick), 3rd 12:06 (7-80, 2:54)
TCU - Ballard 6 yard touchdown run (LoCoco kick), 3rd 9:08 (3-19, 1:11)
Northern Illinois - Tranchitella 32 yard blocked punt return (Nendick kick), 4th 14:14
TCU - Hecht 6 yard touchdown pass from Ballard (LoCoco kick), 4th 10:55 (6-62, 3:19)

TCU rushed for 198 yards while NIU rushed for -20 yards. The Horned Frogs threw for 258 yards while the Huskies threw for 80 yards. They controlled the ball for 32:24 of the game while Jeff Ballard threw 19-of-29 for 258 yards, with three touchdowns runs (rushing for 19 yards on 11 carries). It was not so much that NIU had terrible rushing as it was their quarterback Dan Nicholson, who was sacked five times for -48 yards. TCU finished the season 11-2 while NIU finished 7-6.

Statistics

References

Poinsettia Bowl
Poinsettia Bowl
Northern Illinois Huskies football bowl games
TCU Horned Frogs football bowl games
December 2006 sports events in the United States
Poinsettia Bowl